The Regiment of the North Pole, a medieval outdated astronomy term, is a rule saying how to find the celestial North Pole by the stars. It was used in former centuries when, because of precession, the star Polaris was much further from the celestial North Pole than it is now.

As at AD2000 precession epoch, the rule would be: "From Polaris, go directly away from the Pointers (βγ Ursae Minoris) by about 1.45 times the apparent diameter of the Full Moon."

Observational astronomy
History of astronomy